Pichdeh (also Romanized as Pīchdeh; also known as Pīchīdeh and Pījīdeh) is a village in Kelarestaq-e Gharbi Rural District, in the Central District of Chalus County, Mazandaran Province, Iran. As of  the 2006 census, its population was 124, in 34 families.

References 

Populated places in Chalus County